The men's omnium competition at the 2014 Asian Games was held on 22 and 23 September 2014 at the Incheon International Velodrome.

Schedule
All times are Korea Standard Time (UTC+09:00)

Results
Legend
DNF — Did not finish

Scratch race

Individual pursuit

Elimination race

1km time trial

Flying lap

Points race

Summary

References 
Results

External links 
Official website

Track Men omnium